Soslan Maratovich Gatagov (born 29 September 1992) is a former Russian professional football player.

Club career
He made his debut in the Russian Premier League on 8 April 2012 for FC Spartak Moscow in a game against FC Kuban Krasnodar.

Personal life
His older brother Alan Gatagov is also a professional footballer.

References

External links
 
 
 

1992 births
Living people
Sportspeople from Vladikavkaz
Ossetian people
Russian footballers
Association football defenders
Russian Premier League players
Russian expatriate footballers
Expatriate footballers in Armenia
Expatriate footballers in Belarus
FC Lokomotiv Moscow players
FC Spartak Moscow players
Ulisses FC players
FC Torpedo-BelAZ Zhodino players
Ossetian footballers